, born 25 October 1981, is a Tongan born, Japanese professional Rugby union player. He is the nephew of the former Japan international Nofomuli Taumoefolau

He plays at number eight for Top League club Panasonic Wild Knights.

He moved to Japan on a study abroad programme from Tonga and attended High School in Saitama, Japan at age 16. Holani is fluent in Japanese.

Holani has played 42 tests for the Japan national rugby union team. He earned his 40th cap in the 2015 Pacific Nations Cup in their match against the United States.

References

External links 
 

Living people
People from Nukuʻalofa
Rugby union players in Japan
Japan international rugby union players
Rugby union number eights
Rugby union flankers
Saitama Wild Knights players
Tongan emigrants to Japan
1981 births